is a 1999 Japanese film directed by Hideyuki Hirayama.

Cast
 Mai Toyoda as Yae Anzai
 Toshiteru Hirose as Kou Anzai
 Matsunosuke Shofukutei as Koichi Sekigawa
 Mieko Harada as Harumi Kunimi

References

External links
 

1999 films
Films directed by Hideyuki Hirayama
Films with screenplays by Satoko Okudera
Gakkō no Kaidan
1990s Japanese films

ja:学校の怪談 (映画)#『学校の怪談4』（1999年）
zh:學校怪談 (電影)#1999年電影版